Konyayev (masculine) or Konyayeva (feminine) is a Russian surname. Notable people with the surname include:

Nadezhda Konyayeva (born 1931), Soviet Russian javelin thrower
Vitali Konyayev (born 1937), Soviet Russian actor

Russian-language surnames